In enzymology, a sarsasapogenin 3β-glucosyltransferase is an enzyme that catalyzes the chemical reaction

UDP-glucose + sarsasapogenin  UDP + sarsasapogenin 3-O-β-D-glucoside

Thus, the two substrates of this enzyme are UDP-glucose and sarsasapogenin [(3β,5β,25S)-spirostan-3-ol], whereas its two products are UDP and sarsasapogenin 3-O-β-D-glucoside.

The enzyme was first isolated from the root of the common asparagus (Asparagus officinalis). It is specific for substrate sterols with the uncommon 5β-configuration (sarsasapogenin and smilagenin), that is with a cis-linkage between the A and B rings of the steroid nucleus.

This enzyme belongs to the family of glycosyltransferases, specifically the hexosyltransferases.  The systematic name of this enzyme class is UDP-glucose:(3β,5β,25S)-spirostan-3-ol 3-O-β-D-glucosyltransferase. This enzyme is also called uridine diphosphoglucose-sarsasapogenin glucosyltransferase.

References

EC 2.4.1
Enzymes of unknown structure